The Hertford East branch line is a railway line in Hertfordshire in the United Kingdom, running between Hertford East and . The line follows the route of the Lea Valley, serving intermediate towns and villages.

History

In June 1841 the Northern and Eastern Railway (N&ER) was given parliamentary assent to construct a branch from Broxbourne to Hertford. Work on the line began early in 1843 and the branch (and all stations on it) was opened as a single track on 31 October of that year. Operation by the N&ER was short-lived as it had already agreed that the Eastern Counties Railway would lease its lines (then from Stratford to Bishop's Stortford as well as the Hertford East branch). The line was doubled in October 1846.

The original Hertford station was opened in 1843. It was sited to avoid two nearby schools, but later it was closed and in 1888 Hertford East station was opened further west and closer to the town centre. Another station existed in 1858 on the line from Hatfield, but this closed as soon as Hertford North station opened in 1924.

Part of the Hertford East branch was used for the Buntingford Branch Railway, or "The Bunt", a railway which ran from Buntingford to London from 1863 to 1964. The Buntingford Railway split off this line just to the north of St Margarets station.

Route and services
The line curves away from Broxbourne to the left and heads towards Hertford. For most of its length, it is bounded by the New River on its south side and the River Lea and Lee Navigation on the north side.

Towns and villages served are:
Broxbourne
Rye House on the outskirts of Hoddesdon
St Margarets and neighbouring Stanstead Abbotts
Ware
Hertford East.

The line is part of the Network Rail Strategic Route 5, SRS 05.03 and is classified as a London and South East Commuter line.

There are currently two trains an hour on this line serving all stations. Future plans for this line see the lengthening of platforms to facilitate longer trains and create extra capacity on the line. Services on this line are currently operated by Greater Anglia using Class 720 units consisting of or 5 car formations.

Usually, trains on the Hertford East branch line go to Liverpool Street (on Mondays to Saturdays, via Tottenham Hale and Hackney Downs), and Stratford (on Sundays).  On days of engineering works, train services would often terminate at Broxbourne.

Passenger volume
Below is the passenger usage from the year beginning April 2002 to the year beginning April 2010.

Infrastructure
The line is double track throughout except for a small section through  where it is single track. It is electrified at 25 kV AC using overhead line equipment, and has a loading gauge of W6.

References

Railway lines in the East of England
Rail transport in Hertfordshire
Railway lines opened in 1843
1843 establishments in England